ADAMTS-like protein 1 is a protein that in humans is encoded by the ADAMTSL1 gene.

This gene encodes a secreted protein resembling members of the ADAMTS (a disintegrin and metalloproteinase with thrombospondin motif) family. This protein lacks the propeptide region and the metalloproteinase and disintegrin-like domains, which are typical of the ADAMTS family, but contains other ADAMTS domains, including the thrombospondin type 1 motif. This protein may have important functions in the extracellular matrix. Alternatively spliced transcript variants have been described, but their biological validity has not been determined.

References

Further reading

External links